La Revue de Téhéran (Tehran Magazine) is an Iranian monthly magazine published in French, mainly devoted to issues pertaining to Iranian culture and traditions.

History and profile
Founded in October 2005, La Revue de Téhéran is affiliated to the Ettela'at foundation that publishes both daily newspaper Ettela'at and other publications.  With its headquarters being located in Tehran, it is the only Iranian magazine written in French to be equally distributed beyond its national frontiers to France and other francophone countries worldwide.  The magazine is published by Presses Ettelaat on a monthly basis. It features articles on the culture and traditions of Iran.

References

External links
 Official website of magazine

2005 establishments in Iran
French-language magazines
Magazines established in 2005
Magazines published in Tehran
Monthly magazines published in Iran